"I'll Do You like a Truck" is an electro-dance song written by Gheorghe Constantin Cristinel and Silviu Paduraru. The song was released on August 1, 2008, after which it became a summer hit in Europe.

Music video
Two music videos of "I'll Do You like a Truck" were made, one of which was filmed in Ibiza. The song was used in the television program The Office on the twenty-seventh episode of the fifth season named "Cafe Disco".

Chart performance
The song made its debut on Dutch Singles Chart at number 37 on August 30, 2008. The following week, the song fell out at number 70, and two weeks afterwards, fell out from the position 83.

Formats and track listings
These are the formats and track listings of major single releases of "I'll Do You like a Truck".

Digital download
(Released )
"I'll Do You like a Truck" (Radio Edit)
"I'll Do You like a Truck" (DJ Shizzle & DJ Zet Electribal RMX)
"I'll Do You like a Truck" (Extended Version)
"I'll Do You like a Truck" (Jackmeister Jay After Summer Remix)

References

External links
GeoDaSilva.com — official website.

2008 singles
English-language Romanian songs
2008 songs
Spinnin' Records singles